The George Key Ranch Historic District, also known simply as Key Ranch, is a historic ranch and Victorian ranch house located in Placentia, Orange County, California

Two acres of the former ranch is now the George Key Ranch Historic Park operated by Orange County Parks. It includes the historic house museum, a collection of farm equipment and hand tools, a one-acre orange grove, and 3/4-acre verse garden.

The George Key Ranch Historic District was listed on the National Register of Historic Places in 1975.

See also
National Register of Historic Places listings in Orange County, California
Ranches on the National Register of Historic Places

References

External links

 Orange County Parks: official George Key Ranch Historic Park website

Agriculture museums in the United States
Historic house museums in California
Houses in Orange County, California
Museums in Orange County, California
Placentia, California
Parks in Orange County, California
National Register of Historic Places in Orange County, California
Ranches on the National Register of Historic Places in California
Historic districts on the National Register of Historic Places in California
Victorian architecture in California